Dreams for Sale may refer to:

 "Dreams for Sale" (The Twilight Zone), an episode of the television series The Twilight Zone
 Dreams for Sale (2012 film), a Japanese comedy film